CoxHealth is a six-hospital, 1,050 bed not-for-profit healthcare system headquartered in Springfield, Missouri. It serves a 25 county region of Southwest Missouri and Northwest Arkansas. CoxHealth is Springfield's largest employer, and the 7th largest non-governmental employer in the state of Missouri with more than 12,605 people employed throughout the system.

History 
CoxHealth started on Thanksgiving Day, in 1906, when Ellen Burge, the widow of a prominent Springfield lawyer, donated her frame duplex on Jefferson Avenue to be used as a Methodist hospital. It was named Burge Deaconess Hospital in her honor. The Burge Hospital grew due to the great need for expert healthcare in Southwest Missouri. In 1948, a Springfield business man, Lester E. Cox, was asked to save the hospital from near bankruptcy.  He led a series of capital campaigns for hospital expansion. He was very involved with the hospital's success as the volunteer board chairman. In 1968 Mr. Cox died, and the hospital changed its name from Burge-Protestant Hospital to Lester E. Cox Medical Center in his honor. The hospital continued to grow and prosper thanks, in part, to many great leaders in the organization. Former Presidents include Neil Wortley, Charlie Edwards, Larry Walls, and Robert Bezanson. In 1993, Lester E. Cox Medical Centers became CoxHealth. New technology advancements, along with new medical services, are continually brought to Southwest Missouri thanks to CoxHealth. The hospital continues “to be the best for those who need us.”

Facilities

Cox South 

Cox Medical Center South is the largest facility and main campus operated by CoxHealth. Construction started in 1981, and the ten story Cox South hospital was completed in 1985. The full-service hospital features 563 beds and houses the main service lines of the system.  It includes a Level 1 Trauma Center, Level 1 STEMI Center, and Level 1 Stroke Center. The Hulston Cancer Center and Wheeler Heart and Vascular Center are connected to the main Cox South hospital via the "Skywalk" enclosed walkway over National Avenue. The Turner Center is a women and children specialty outpatient center connected to Cox South.  The Jared Neuoro Science Center and The Dee Ann White Women's and Children's hospital are featured in the newest 10 story tower on the campus.

In 2010, Cox South opened a new emergency department, and in 2012, it was designated a Level I Trauma Center. CoxHealth has over 160,000 emergency, urgent care, and trauma visits each year. In June 2007, CoxHealth purchased a new MD Helicopters MD Explorer 902 for $5.1 million. The new helicopter replaces the smaller 1989 Messerschmitt MBB Bo 105LS air ambulance. The new helicopter has a top speed of 160 m.p.h. and includes a quieter design and improved safety because of the lack of a tail rotor. Cox Air Care was one of the first, in the state of Missouri, to fly with night vision goggles and the only one in the state to fly with blood on board.

The Martin Center is a free standing diagnostic and imaging center. The four story facility houses MRI, CT, heart and lung CT, mammogram, ultrasound, nuclear medicine and PET imaging, X-Ray, and bone density scanning equipment all under one roof.

Burrell Behavioral Health, with CoxHealth, supplies outpatient child and adult mental health services. They are located on the Cox South Campus next to Burrell Park.

A Ronald McDonald House is located on the Cox South campus to provide a low cost and friendly living area for those with children in the hospital.

Cox North 
Cox North is the site of the original Burge Hospital, which opened in 1906 and eventually became CoxHealth. Cox North currently features 73 beds. This includes a 40,000 visit emergency room, Cox College (a 1,000 student College of Allied Health), The Cox Family Medicine Residency Teaching Program and a 30,000 visit clinic and CoxHealth's inpatient behavioral health units are housed at Cox North.

Meyer Orthopedic and Rehabilitation Hospital 
Meyer Orthopedic and Rehabilitation Hospital is located just north of the main Cox South campus, and is a specifically designed orthopedic specialty hospital to house all of CoxHealth's orthopedic procedures. The new hospital features 35 private orthopedic patient rooms, 15 in-patient rehabilitation rooms, and 35 transitional care rooms. All operating rooms will be constructed to orthopedic-specific specifications.

Cox Medical Center Branson 
In 2012, Skaggs Regional Medical Center in Branson became a part of CoxHealth and was renamed Cox Medical Center Branson. It is a 122-bed hospital chiefly serving Stone and Taney County Missouri.

Cox Health Plans 
Cox Health Plans is an affiliate of CoxHealth that provides insurance for nearly 45,000 members across Missouri and throughout the nation. Starting in 1995, Cox HealthPlans is composed of teams in Medical Management, Claims Processing, Member Services, Finance, Underwriting, Information Technology, and Marketing. The Institute for Health and Productivity Management (IHPM) announced, in February 2010, that Cox HealthPlans was selected to receive a 2009 Value-Based Health Award for small employer. Cox HealthPlans was recognized for demonstrating leadership and innovation in value health management, in support with work done with the employers of Southwest Area Manufacturers Association health benefit design. Cox HealthPlans received the 2011 Trizetto IHM Power Award in the category of Operational Excellence.

Meyer Center for Wellness and Rehabilitation
The Meyer Center for Wellness and Rehabilitation is a medical facility that directly connected to the Meyer Orthopedic and Rehabilitation Hospital. The Meyer Center offers a work-out facility, pools, and a gym to patients and to the public.

Bone and Joint Center
The Bone and Joint Center is connected to the Meyer Center via an overhead enclosed walkway. This center offers sports medicine services, medical offices and imaging services.

CoxHealth Surgery Center
The CoxHealth Surgery Center is dedicated to non-orthopedic surgeries. The two story facility is also the main location for ear, nose, and throat procedures.

Cox Monett
Cox Monett is a community hospital in Monett, Missouri. Cox Monett features 25 beds and serves the counties to the southwest of Springfield. A new replacement facility has been announced with expected completing in the fall of 2020.

Cox Barton County-is a 25-bed critical access hospital operating in Lamar, Missouri, and joined the system in 2018.

Other facilities
CoxHealth operates a number of clinics and facilities throughout southwest Missouri. CoxHealth also operates "The Clinic at Walmart" clinics which offer fast, affordable access to basic health care services with upfront pricing. "The Clinic at Walmart" can be found at many local Walmart stores. CoxHealth also offers multiple urgent care centers including one in Springfield that is operated 24 hours per day.

Community impact 
CoxHealth provides over $100,000,000 of charity care to the community per year for uncompensated medical care.  CoxHealth has been recognized for their economic impact and charitable work in the southwest Missouri area.

Children's Miracle Network Hospitals of CoxHealth is a non-profit organization that raises and provides resources to assist in the medical care of children under the age of 18. Over a million dollars is raised with the partnering of KYTV (KY3) for donations to the Children's Miracle Network program.

Notes

Healthcare in Missouri
Hospital networks in the United States
Medical and health organizations based in Missouri
1906 establishments in Missouri